Katara Hospitality, formerly known as Qatar National Hotels Company, is the largest hotel owner, developer and operator in Qatar. It is government-owned. As of 2016, the company owns properties in Qatar, Egypt, Morocco, the United Kingdom, France, Italy, Singapore, the Netherlands, the United States, Switzerland, Spain and Thailand. The company has a portfolio of 40 hotels in mid-2019.

History
The company was originally formed in 1970 as Qatar National Hotels Limited (QNH). In 1973, Marriott Hotel, then known as Gulf Hotel and owned by QNH, became the country's five-star hotel. In 1993, this company was replaced by Qatar National Hotels Company. In 2012, it was rebranded under its current form, Katara Hospitality. 'Katara' derives its name from the common spelling used for 'Qatar' by ancient cartographers.

World Travel Awards named Katara Hospitality as the "World's Leading Hospitality Company" in 2013, 2014 and 2015.

Activities

Several Qatar-based hotels are owned by the company, and there are many projects currently in construction. Hotels operating in Qatar include Al Messila, a Luxury Collection Resort & Spa, Doha, Mövenpick Hotel Doha, Sealine Beach, a Murwab Resort, Sharq Village & Spa, Sheraton Grand Doha Resort & Convention Hotel, Simaisma, a Murwab Resort, Somerset West Bay Doha, The Avenue, a Murwab Hotel and The Ritz-Carlton, Doha. 

Katara Hospitality opened Sheraton Doha Resort & Convention Hotel in 1982. In a partnership with the premier Spanish football division, La Liga, Katara Hospitality launched the first-ever "La Liga lounge" at the Sheraton Resort in Doha in March 2017.

Properties
In 2012, Katara had a portfolio of 24 hotels. By mid-2017, the company had increased its portfolio to 40 hotels.
 Qatar: Al Bayt Hotel Apartments by Murwab, Al Messila, a Luxury Collection Resort & Spa, Doha, City Gate Hotel, Dana Club, Hilton Salwa Beach Resort & Villas, Hotel Park, Jouri, a Murwab Hotel, Fairmont and Raffles Doha, Lusail Marina District, Mövenpick Hotel Doha, Rixos Beach Resort, Qetaifan Island North, Rixos Gulf Hotel Doha, Sealine Beach, a Murwab Resort, Sharq Village & Spa, A Ritz-Carlton Hotel, Sheraton Grand Doha Resort & Convention Hotel, Simaisma, a Murwab Resort, Somerset West Bay Doha, The Avenue, a Murwab Hotel, The Ritz-Carlton, Doha, The West House Hotel & Residence.
 Switzerland: Bürgenstock Resort Lake Lucerne, Hotel Royal Savoy Lausanne, Hotel Schweizerhof – Bern.
 France: Carlton Cannes, Le Royal Monceau – Raffles Paris, Maison Delano, The Peninsula Paris
 Italy: Excelsior Hotel Gallia, a Luxury Collection Hotel, Milan, The Westin Excelsior Rome
 UK: Grosvenor House, A JW Marriott Hotel, The Adria, The Savoy, A Fairmont Managed Hotel
 The Netherlands: InterContinental Amstel Amsterdam
 Spain: InterContinental Madrid
 Morocco: Fairmont Tazi Palace, Tangier
 Egypt: Renaissance Sharm El Sheikh Golden View Beach Resort
 Thailand: Chiva-Som
 Singapore: Raffles Hotel Singapore
 US: Dream Downtown, The Plaza, A Fairmont Managed Hotel

Investments

Africa

Katara Hospitality's first international investment came in 2006, under its previous identity, Qatar National Hotels Company (QNH). That year, it acquired Egypt's Renaissance Sharm El Sheikh Resort.

In April 2010, QNH signed a deal with the Comoran government to build a $70 million hotel resort in Comoros. The deal came after a donors conference geared towards Comoros was hosted by Qatar in March 2010.

Morocco and the QNH signed a $55 million deal in November 2011 to refurbish the Tazi Palace, located in Tangier.

In Gambia, the company signed a deal with the Gambian government in October 2012 to build a $200 million resort next to Banjul, the capital.

Europe
The Excelsior Hotel Gallia in Milan, Italy was acquired by the company in 2015. It is part of The Luxury Collection. In addition it runs the Westin Excelsior Rome. 

Katara Hospitality has invested in several properties in Paris. Hotels it owns include The Peninsula Paris and the Royal Monceau Raffles Paris.

In Switzerland, the company has invested $1 billion into renovating the Bürgenstock Resort Lake Lucerne, which it owns.

In the Netherlands, Katara Hospitality own the Amstel Hotel run by the Intercontinental Group.

Americas
Katara Hospitality acquired full ownership of New York City's Plaza Hotel in July 2018 after buying the hotel's ownership stakes from Sahara India Pariwar, and from Ben Ashkenazy and Al-Waleed bin Talal.

Subsidiaries

 Murwab Hotels Group
 Qetaifan Projects Company

See also

References

Hospitality companies of Qatar
1970 establishments in Qatar
Hospitality companies established in 1970
Qatari companies established in 1993
Qatari companies established in 2012